Emporium may refer to:

Historical
 Emporium (antiquity), a trading post, factory, or market of Classical antiquity
 Emporium (early medieval), a 6th- to 9th-century trading settlement in Northwestern Europe
 Emporium (Italy), an ancient town on the site of present-day Empoli, Italy
 Emporium (Rome), the river port of ancient Rome
 Emporium (Jamestown, California), a building listed on the US National Register of Historic Places (NRHP) in Tuolumne County
 Emporium (Marshall, Michigan), an NRHP-listed commercial building

Businesses
 A large retail store
 Emporium (Bangkok), a shopping mall in Thailand
 Emporium (department store chain), a defunct retailer in five western US states
 The Emporium (San Francisco), a defunct department store chain in the San Francisco Bay Area, California, US
 The Emporium, Leicestershire, a nightclub in Coalville, Leicestershire, UK
 Emporium Mall, in Lahore, Pakistan
 Emporium Mall Pluit, in Pluit, Jakarta, Indonesia
 Emporium Melbourne, a shopping centre in Australia

Other uses
 Emporium, Pennsylvania, US
 Emporium (short story collection), a 2002 book by Adam Johnson

See also
 
Empúries town founded with the name of Ἐμπόριον (Emporion), in 575 BC, by Greek colonists from Phocaea
 Emporia (disambiguation)
 Emporio (disambiguation)